The Paraguayan ambassador in Bogotá is the official representative of the Government in Asunción to the Government of Colombia.

List of representatives

References 

 
Colombia
Paraguay